Timo Rost (born 29 August 1978) is a German football manager and former player who last managed Erzgebirge Aue.

Coaching career
Rost took over as manager of SpVgg Bayreuth in 2018. After gaining promotion to the 3. Liga, he moved to Erzgebirge Aue. On 20 September 2022, after nine games without a win, Aue announced Rost had been sacked.

References

External links
 
 
 

1978 births
Living people
People from Lauf an der Pegnitz
Sportspeople from Middle Franconia
German footballers
Association football midfielders
Germany under-21 international footballers
Germany youth international footballers
Bundesliga players
2. Bundesliga players
Austrian Football Bundesliga players
FC Amberg players
1. FC Nürnberg players
VfB Stuttgart players
FK Austria Wien players
FC Energie Cottbus players
RB Leipzig players
German football managers
FC Erzgebirge Aue managers
3. Liga managers
German expatriate footballers
German expatriate sportspeople in Austria
Expatriate footballers in Austria
Footballers from Bavaria